Vavilov Hill is a hill, 2,640 m (8661 ft), standing 3 nautical miles (6 km) west of Shatskiy Hill in the Weyprecht Mountains of Queen Maud Land. First roughly plotted from air photos by the German Antarctic Expedition, 1938–39. Mapped from air photos and surveys by Norwegian Antarctic Expedition, 1956–60; remapped by Soviet Antarctic Expedition, 1960–61, and named after Soviet botanist Nikolay I. Vavilov.

References

Hills of Queen Maud Land
Princess Astrid Coast